Lisa Arrindell is an American actress. She is most known for her role as Vanessa in Madea's Family Reunion (2006), Heather Comstock in the series In the House (1995), and Toynelle Davis in Livin' Large (1991).

Early life and education
Lisa Arrindell was born at Parkchester General Hospital in the Bronx on March 24, 1969 and brought straight home to Brooklyn, where she grew up. She attended the High School of Performing Arts, now called Fiorello H. LaGuardia High School. She earned her Bachelor of Fine Arts Degree in Theatre from The Juilliard School in New York City.

Career
Arrindell made her film debut in Walt Disney's One Good Cop alongside Michael Keaton in 1991. That same year, she played the lead in the comedy Livin' Large. She later appeared in Trial by Jury (1994) and Spike Lee's Clockers (1995). Arrindell was a series regular in the NBC sitcom, In the House in 1995. She co-starred in several made-for-television movies, including A Lesson Before Dying (1999) alongside Don Cheadle and Cicely Tyson, and Disappearing Acts (2000) starring Sanaa Lathan. In 2006, Arrindell appeared in three films, Big Momma's House 2, The Second Chance, and Madea's Family Reunion. In 2010, she appeared in The Wronged Man with Julia Ormond and Mahershala Ali. Arrindell appeared opposite Isaiah Washington in the thriller The Sin Seer (2015), The Immortal Life of Henrietta Lacks (2017), starring Oprah Winfrey. She also had guest starring roles on The Cosby Show, The Practice, The Steve Harvey Show, Drop Dead Diva, Law & Order: Special Victims Unit, and Elementary. In 2017, she had a recurring role in the Bounce TV prime-time soap opera Saints & Sinners. She also appeared in Fox's Our Kind of People in 2022. 

Arrindell recently starred in the film 12 Angry Men And...Women on Apple TV with Wendell Pierce and BET's Favorite Son (2021). Arrindell opened the revival of Law & Order (2022) in its first episode as Veronica King. Arrindell has guest starred on several other network series, including Random Acts of Flyness, Bull, Elementary, Madam Secretary, Law & Order SVU, and Notorious. Some of her stage performances include the Broadway revival of Cat On a Hot Tin Roof with James Earl Jones and Phylicia Rashad, Jubilee (Arena Stage), Reparations (Billie Holiday Theatre), Richard III (Delacorte Theater), Heliotrope Bouquet (Playwrights Horizons), and Earth & Sky (Second Stage).

Personal life
Arrindell married Basil Anderson in 1993. They have two children. The couple divorced in 2015, and she reverted to her maiden name. She lives in New York City.

Filmography

Film

Television

References

External links

20th-century American actresses
21st-century American actresses
Actresses from New York City
African-American actresses
American stage actresses
American film actresses
American television actresses
Juilliard School alumni
Living people
People from the Bronx
20th-century African-American women
20th-century African-American people
21st-century African-American women
21st-century African-American people
Year of birth missing (living people)